Cope Butte is a  prominence adjacent the course of the Colorado River, in the Grand Canyon and sitting on the south side of Granite Gorge. The butte has a narrow, triangular footprint, and contains a northwest-by-south slightly arcuate ridgeline spire. The prominence is near the north terminus of the sharp ridgeline, and is composed of white Surprise Canyon Formation.

Cope Butte drains west into the Hermit Canyon watershed (Hermit Creek); the east side of the butte sits on the terminus canyon of Monument Creek (Grand Canyon). Because Cope Butte sits on Granite Gorge (Tonto Platform, south side) the Tonto Trail traverses northwest-to-southeast around the butte's base. The Hermit Trail, from the south, and from Hermits Rest viewpoint (South Rim), excursions down Cathedral Stairs (red Supai Group units), and courses down the southwest base of the butte, to enter Lower Hermit Canyon.

See also
 Geology of the Grand Canyon area
 Dana Butte

References

External links

 Aerial view, Cope Butte, Mountainzone

Buttes of Arizona
Grand Canyon
Grand Canyon National Park
Landforms of Coconino County, Arizona
North American 1000 m summits